Simonyan or in Western Armenian Simonian ) or Germanified Simonjan is an Armenian surname, equivalent to English Simpson. Notable people with the name include:

People

Simonian
Hovann Simonian, Armenian Swiss scholar in Armenian history
Hrair Simonian (born 1991), Armenian chess grandmaster
Nariné Simonian (born 1965, French-Armenian organist
Rupert Simonian (born 1991), British actor of Armenian origin
Sebu Simonian (born 1978), member of the American band duo Capital Cities
Simon Simonian (1914-1986), Lebanese-Armenian intellectual, writer, activist and teacher, founder of the literary Armenian periodical Spurk

Simonyan
Artem Simonyan (born 1995), Armenian footballer
Artyom Simonyan (born 1975), Armenian boxer
Gagik Simonyan (born 1971), Armenian footballer
Margarita Simonyan (born 1980), Russian journalist and editor-in-chief
Mikhail Simonyan (born 1986), Russian-American violinist
Nadezhda Simonyan (1922-1997), Russian film composer
Nikita Simonyan (born 1926), Russian former footballer, coach, and sports official
Tata Simonyan (born 1962), Armenian singer

See also
Simonians, a 2nd-century Gnostic sect established by Simon Magus

Armenian-language surnames
Patronymic surnames
Surnames from given names